Jeffrey Noel Langley (born 28 October 1948) is a former Australian cricketer who played for South Australia and Queensland during the 1970s. He was the nephew of Gil Langley and played primarily as a batsman.

External links
Jeffrey Langley at Cricinfo
Jeffrey Langley at CricketArchive

1948 births
Living people
Queensland cricketers
South Australia cricketers
Australian cricketers